Gil (Harry Gilbert) Trythall (born October 28, 1930) is an American composer and pianist of contemporary classical music.

Early life and education
Trythall was born on October 28, 1930 in Knoxville, Tennessee, the older brother of composer and pianist Richard Aaker Trythall. 
He attended Central High School in Knoxville and, in 1948, he enrolled at the University of Tennessee where he studied under David Van Vactor graduating with a Bachelor of Arts in 1951. He was then admitted, that same year, to Northwestern University where he studied under Wallingford Riegger obtaining a Master of Music in 1952.

Trythall served in the United States Air Force from 1953 to 1957. He then completed his music studies attending, from 1957 to 1960, advanced composition courses at Cornell University where he studied under Robert Moffat Palmer obtaining a Doctor of Musical Arts degree.

Trythall was part of the group of David Van Vactor's notable students named the Van Vactor Five together with Richard Aaker Trythall, David P. Sartor, Jesse Ayers, and Doug Davis.

Career
Trythall started his academic career as a graduate assistant during his studies at Cornell University after which he served as an assistant professor at Knox College in Galesburg, Illinois from 1960 to 1964 where he was director of the Knox-Galesburg Symphony Orchestra. He was then appointed professor of music theory and composition at Peabody College in Nashville, Tennessee where he taught from 1964 to 1975. During his academic tenure he also served as chairman of the Department of Music from 1973 to 1975. He was then appointed dean of the Creative Arts Center at West Virginia University in Morgantown, West Virginia from 1975 to 1981.

Following his retirement in 1996, he was a visiting professor of music at the Federal University of Espírito Santo in Vitória, Brazil from 1999 to 2001, where he taught courses in music.

As a musician, Trythall is best known for his experiments and compositions in electronic music.

Personal life

Trythall married Jean Marie Slater on December 28, 1951 but the couple divorced in 1976. He then married Carol King on September 19, 1985. Trythall has two daughters from his first marriage, Linda Marie and Karen Elizabeth.

Compositions
1960 – Symphony no. 1
1958 – A Solemn Chant, for strings
1960 – The Music Lesson
1961 – Fanfare and Celebration
1961 – A String Quartet
1962 – Surfaces, for wind ensemble, tape, and lights
1963 – A Harp Concerto
1964 – Dionysia, for chamber orchestra
1964 – A Flute Sonata
1966 – A Vacuum Soprano, for brass quintet and tape
1967 – Entropy, for stereo brass, improvisation group, and stereo tape
1968 – In the Presence, for chorus and tape
1969 – The Electronic Womb, for tape
1971 – Echospace, for brass, tape, and film
1971 – A Time to Every Purpose, for chorus and tape
1975 – Cyndy the Synth (Minnie the Moog), for synthesizer and string orchestra
1981 – Luxikon II, for tape
1982 – The Terminal Opera
1988 – Mass in English and Spanish, for congregation, organ, and descant
1989 – Sinfonia Concertante
1990 – From the Egyptian Book of the Dead, for soprano, saxophone or wind controller, and synthesizer
1993 – The Pastimes of Lord Chaitanya, for jazz soprano and synthesizer
1994 – Intermission, for soprano and synthesizer

Discography
 Symphony No. 1 , Knoxville Symphony Orchestra, David Van Vactor, Composers Recordings, Inc. (1961)
 Yakety Moog / Foggy Mountain Breakdown , Athena Records, (1970)
 Switched On Nashville (Country Moog), Athena Records, (1972)
 Nashville Gold (Switched On Moog), Summit Records Australia, (1973)
 Principles and Practice of Electronic Music, Grosset & Dunlap, (1973)
 Luxikon II / Echospace, Pandora Music, (1980)
 Country Moog + Nashville Gold, Vroom Sound Records, (2003)
 Country Moog (Switched On Nashville) / Nashville Gold (Switched On Moog), The Omni Recording Corporation, (2007)

Publications
 Principles and Practice of Electronic Music, Grosset & Dunlap, 1973
 Eighteenth Century Counterpoint, Brown & Benchmark, 1993
 Sixteenth Century Counterpoint, Brown & Benchmark, 1994

References

External links
Official website

Biography at AllMusic
Gilbert Harry Trythall at DMOZ

20th-century classical composers
Cornell University alumni
Northwestern University alumni
American classical composers
Musicians from Tennessee
American people of Norwegian descent
American male classical composers
People from Knoxville, Tennessee
1930 births
University of Tennessee alumni
Living people
American people of Welsh descent
20th-century American composers
20th-century American male musicians